Nebria rubripes olivieri is a subspecies of ground beetle in the  Nebriinae subfamily that can be found in France and Spain.

References

rubripes olivieri
Beetles described in 1826
Beetles of Europe